Cirrhochrista cydippealis is a moth in the family Crambidae. It was described by Francis Walker in 1859 and it is found on Borneo.

The forewings are white with a cinereous-brown exterior border. The interior and exterior lines are brown.

References

Moths described in 1859
Spilomelinae
Moths of Borneo